Forrest Richard Betts (born December 12, 1943) is an American guitarist, singer, songwriter, and composer best known as a founding member of The Allman Brothers Band.

Early in his career, he collaborated with Duane Allman, introducing melodic twin guitar harmony and counterpoint which "rewrote the rules for how two rock guitarists can work together, completely scrapping the traditional rhythm/lead roles to stand toe to toe". Following Allman's death in 1971, Betts assumed sole lead guitar duties during the peak of the group's commercial success in the mid-1970s. Betts was the writer and singer on the Allmans' hit single "Ramblin' Man". He also gained renown for composing instrumentals, with one appearing on most of the group's albums, including "In Memory of Elizabeth Reed" and "Jessica" (which was later used as the theme to Top Gear).  

The band went through a hiatus in the late 1970s, during which time Betts, like many of the other band members, pursued a solo career and side projects under such names as Great Southern and The Dickey Betts Band.  The Allman Brothers reformed in 1979, with Dan Toler taking the second guitar role alongside Betts.  In 1982, they broke up a second time, during which time Betts formed the group Betts, Hall, Leavell and Trucks, which lasted until 1984.  A third reformation occurred in 1989, with Warren Haynes now joining Betts on guitar.  Betts would be ousted from the band in 2000 over a conflict regarding Betts's continued drug and alcohol use; he would never play with them again and has not since appeared with any former band members for reunions or side projects.  He remains (alongside Jaimoe) one of only two living founders of the Allman Brothers Band.

He was inducted with the band into the Rock and Roll Hall of Fame in 1995 and also won a best rock performance Grammy Award with the band for "Jessica" in 1996. Betts was ranked No. 58 on Rolling Stone's 100 Greatest Guitarists of All Time list in 2003, and No. 61 on the list published in 2011.

Early life
Born in West Palm Beach on December 12, 1943 and raised in Bradenton, Florida, Betts grew up in a musical family listening to traditional bluegrass, country music and Western swing. He started playing ukulele at five and, as his hands got bigger, moved on to mandolin, banjo, and guitar. At sixteen and feeling the need for something "a little faster", he played in a series of rock bands on the Florida circuit, up the East Coast and into the Midwest before forming Second Coming with Berry Oakley in 1967. According to Rick Derringer, the "group called the Jokers" referenced in "Rock and Roll, Hoochie Koo" was one of Betts' early groups.

Career

Early Allman Brothers Band years 
In 1969, Duane Allman had parlayed success as a session player into a contract with Southern soul impresario Phil Walden, who planned to back a power trio featuring Allman. The ensuing Allman Brothers Band eventually grew to six members, including Duane's brother Gregg, Betts, and Oakley.

After the death of Duane Allman in late 1971, Betts became the band's sole guitarist and also took on a greater singing and leadership role. Betts, over the course of one night's traveling, practiced slide guitar intensively in order to cover the majority of Duane's parts. He went on to write "Jessica" and the Allmans' biggest commercial hit, "Ramblin' Man". "Jessica" was inspired by his daughter of the same name.

Solo career and later work 

Betts's first solo album, Highway Call, was released in 1974, and featured fiddle player Vassar Clements. After the Allman Brothers fell apart in 1976, Betts released more albums, starting with Dickey Betts & Great Southern in 1977, which included the song "Bougainvillea", co-written with future Hollywood star Don Johnson. In 1978 he released an album, Atlanta's Burning Down.

The Allman Brothers reformed in 1979 for the album Enlightened Rogues with two members of Great Southern replacing Allman Brothers members unwilling to participate in the reunion: guitar player Dan Toler (for pianist Chuck Leavell) and bassist David "Rook" Goldflies (for bassist Lamar Williams). Several albums would follow, with various personnel changes, until steadily declining record and concert ticket sales and tensions around management issues led the group to again disband in 1982.

Betts then formed Betts, Hall, Leavell and Trucks, where he was co-frontman along with former Wet Willie singer, saxophone, and harmonica player Jimmy Hall. Despite getting good notices, the group was unable to secure a recording contract and disbanded in 1984. Betts then returned to his solo career, performing live at smaller venues and releasing the album Pattern Disruptive in 1989. When a one-off reunion tour was proposed in support of the Allman Brothers' Dreams box set released in 1989 to commemorate the band's 20th anniversary, Betts's solo band again supplied the Allman Brothers' other guitarist, slide guitarist Warren Haynes. The one-off tour's success resulted in a permanent reunion which absorbed Betts's energies for the remainder of the 1990s. This band lineup went on to release three acclaimed studio albums between 1990 and 1994.

Betts was replaced on numerous Allman Brothers tour dates throughout the mid-to-late 1990s, for what were reported in the media as "personal reasons". While remaining active as a touring band, they failed to release an album of new studio material after 1994's Where It All Begins until 2003's Hittin' the Note. Haynes and Allman Brothers bassist Allen Woody formed Gov't Mule with former Dickey Betts Band drummer Matt Abts as a side project in 1994, and left the Allman Brothers for Gov't Mule full-time in 1997. Betts' last show with the Allman Brothers was at the Music Midtown Festival in Atlanta, Georgia on May 7, 2000.

Things reached a breaking point when the remaining original Allman Brothers members – Gregg Allman, Butch Trucks and Jaimoe – suspended Betts (reportedly via fax) before the launch of the band's Summer Campaign Tour 2000. According to Betts, the band told him in the fax to get clean (presumably from alcohol and/or drugs). Betts was subsequently ordered out of the band after the dispute went to arbitration.

Betts was temporarily replaced for the 2000 tour by Jimmy Herring, formerly of the Aquarium Rescue Unit. When Betts filed suit against the other three original Allmans, the separation turned into a permanent divorce. Although separated personally and as musical bandmates for over 15 years, Betts and Gregg Allman did reconcile before Allman's death in 2017. Betts re-formed the Dickey Betts Band in 2000 and toured that summer. The band reassumed the name Dickey Betts & Great Southern and added Betts' son Duane (named after Duane Allman) on lead guitar. In 2005, Betts released the DVD Live from the Rock and Roll Hall of Fame.

Personal life
Betts married his fifth wife, Donna, in 1989. He has four children: Kimberly, Christy, Jessica and Duane. Christy is married to Frank Hannon of the band Tesla. Duane, named for Betts' former bandmate Duane Allman, is also a musician and has performed and recorded with his father.

In August 2018, Betts suffered a mild stroke and had to cancel upcoming tour dates with his Dickey Betts Band. He was in critical yet stable condition at a Florida hospital following an accident at his home in Osprey, Florida. An operation was planned for September 20, 2018. He successfully underwent surgery to relieve swelling on his brain. In a statement posted on his website, Betts and his family said the "outpouring of support from all over the world has been overwhelming and amazing. We are so appreciative."

Although he briefly resided in Georgia during the formative years of the Allman Brothers Band, he has lived in the Sarasota metropolitan area for most of his life.

Name
Betts's name has been styled in several different ways on recordings throughout his career:

1969: "Dick Betts" on the jacket of The Allman Brothers Band self-titled album
1970–72: "Dicky Betts" on the jackets of Idlewild South and Eat A Peach
1973–74: "Richard Betts" on Brothers and Sisters and his first solo album, Highway Call
Afterward: "Dickey Betts"

Discography

 Highway Call (1974) (as Richard Betts)
 Dickey Betts & Great Southern (1977) (as Dickey Betts & Great Southern)
 Atlanta's Burning Down (1978) (as Dickey Betts & Great Southern)
 Pattern Disruptive (1988) (as Dickey Betts Band)
 Let's Get Together (2001) (as Dickey Betts Band)
 The Collectors #1 (2002) (as Dickey Betts & Great Southern)
 Instant Live: The Odeon – Cleveland, OH 3/09/04 (2004) (as Dickey Betts & Great Southern)
 Bougainvillea's Call: The Very Best of Dickey Betts 1973-1988 (2006) (as Dickey Betts)
 The Official Bootleg (2007) (as Dickey Betts & Great Southern)
 Rockpalast: 30 Years of Southern Rock (1978–2008) (2010) (as Dickey Betts & Great Southern)
 Live at the Coffee Pot 1983 (2016) (as Betts, Hall, Leavell and Trucks)
 Live from the Lone Star Roadhouse (2018) (as Dickey Betts) 
 Ramblin' Man: Live at the St. George Theatre (2019) (as Dickey Betts Band)
 Official Bootleg Vol.1 (2021) (as Dickey Betts & Great Southern)

References

External links
Official website

1943 births
Living people
American male singers
American rock guitarists
Songwriters from Florida
American blues guitarists
American country guitarists
American country rock musicians
American country rock singers
American male guitarists
The Allman Brothers Band members
Lead guitarists
People from West Palm Beach, Florida
Arista Records artists
20th-century American guitarists
Blues rock musicians